Jamie Baden Lee (born 3 December 1971 in Gisborne, New Zealand) is a former New Zealand cricketer, who played two first-class and five one-day matches for the Northern Districts Knights in the 2003-04.

References

1971 births
Living people
New Zealand cricketers
Northern Districts cricketers
Cricketers from Gisborne, New Zealand